Michael Lewis (born July 27, 1977) is an American college basketball coach and former player who is the head coach of the Ball State Cardinals men's team. He played in college for the Indiana Hoosiers.

Playing career
Lewis played basketball high school basketball at Jasper High School where he scored 2,138 career points, and was named Gatorade Player of the Year in 1996. In college, Lewis played at Indiana University Bloomington, where he was an all-Big Ten third team selection and ranks second all-time in Indiana history in assists playing for the Hoosiers under Bob Knight.

Indiana statistics

Cited from Sports Reference.

Coaching career
After a brief professional playing career, Lewis began coaching as a graduate assistant under Knight for two seasons at Texas Tech before a one-year assistant coaching stop at Stephen F. Austin. The next six seasons Lewis would be an assistant coach at Eastern Illinois, before accepting a job on Brad Stevens' staff at Butler. He would stay on staff of the Bulldogs for both Brandon Miller and parts of Chris Holtmann's coaching stints before joining Tim Miles on his coaching staff at Nebraska. Lewis would move on to UCLA under Mick Cronin in 2019, and was part of the Bruins' 2021 Final Four team.

On March 25, 2022, Lewis was announced as the new head coach at Ball State.

Head coaching record

References

External links
 Ball State bio

Living people
1970 births
American men's basketball coaches
American men's basketball players
Ball State Cardinals men's basketball coaches
Basketball coaches from Indiana
Basketball players from Indiana
College men's basketball head coaches in the United States
Eastern Illinois Panthers men's basketball coaches
Indiana Hoosiers men's basketball players
Texas Tech Red Raiders basketball coaches
Stephen F. Austin Lumberjacks basketball coaches
Butler Bulldogs men's basketball coaches
Nebraska Cornhuskers men's basketball coaches
UCLA Bruins men's basketball coaches
Point guards